Middle-Earth Play-By-Mail (or Middle-earth PBM), is a turn-based, strategy play by email and play-by-mail game set in the world of J.R.R. Tolkien’s The Lord of the Rings and The Hobbit, including elements from ICE's Middle-earth Role Playing
under licence from GSIL. The game is now run as Middle-earth Strategic Gaming by Middle-earth Games, Ltd.

History and development
Middle Earth Play-By-Mail (or MEPBM) was created by Game Systems Inc. (GSI) and inspired by J.R.R. Tolkien's books The Hobbit and Lord of the Rings.

In 2001, the game had multiple variants including ones set in the year 1650 or 2950 "War of the Ring, or the Fourth Age". There was also a "mini-module" called "Battle of the Five Armies".

Gameplay
Simply put, to win this game, you work together with your teammates to take control of the lands of Middle-earth. There is no one way to achieve this aim; instead, victory is gained through a combination of martial strength, magical prowess, and economic power. Each nation has its own strengths and weaknesses, and the best teams utilise the strengths of each of its members whilst taking advantage of the weaknesses of their opponents.

Gameplay includes factors such as "character development, nation management, economics, diplomacy, and warfare". 

There are several scenarios with smaller maps, including The Battle of Five Armies - based on The Hobbit, The Untold War based on the battles from The Lord of the Rings not focused on in the novels, focusing on Dol Guldur and Lothlórien which are only covered in the appendices, and variations on the main game, including Kin-strife and Gunboat variations.

Reception
Middle-Earth has won a number of awards since inception. It won the Origins Award for Best New Play-by-Mail Game of 1991, and won the Origins Award for Best Play-by-Mail Game of 1992, 1995, and 1996. Middle Earth PBM won Paper Mayhem's Best PBM Game of 1993. Middle-earth PBM Fourth Age, circa 1000 won the Origins Award for Best New Play-by-Mail Game of 1997, and the Best Ongoing Play-by-Mail Game of 1998 and 1999, and Middle Earth FA 1000 won for "Best Play By Mail Game" in 2001. In 1998, the game was inducted into the Origins Award Adventure Gaming Hall of Fame.

The game continued winning awards in the 21st century as well. It won the Origins Award Gamer's Choice: Best Play-by-Mail of 2003.

See also
 List of play-by-mail games

References

Bibliography

Further reading
 
 . Magazine date: December—January 2003/2004.

External links
Middle-earth Games

Games based on Middle-earth
Origins Award winners
Play-by-mail games